Loren James Wright (May 11, 1917 – September 10, 2005) was an American professional basketball player. He played in the National Basketball League in four games for the Cincinnati Comellos during the 1937–38 season and averaged 1.0 points per game.

References

External links
 Dayton Daily News obituary

1917 births
2005 deaths
American men's basketball players
Basketball players from Dayton, Ohio
Cincinnati Comellos players
Forwards (basketball)
Guards (basketball)